Hairini is a suburb of Tauranga in the Bay of Plenty region of New Zealand's North Island.

The New Zealand Transport Agency is constructing a road underpass through the suburb.

It has two marae. Hairini Marae and Ranginui meeting house is a meeting place of the Ngāti Ranginui hapū of Ngāi Te Ahi. Waimapu or Ruahine Marae and Te Kaupapa o Tawhito meeting house is a meeting place of the Ngāti Ranginui hapū of Ngāti Ruahine.

Demographics

Hairini had a population of 3,330 at the 2018 New Zealand census, an increase of 381 people (12.9%) since the 2013 census, and an increase of 378 people (12.8%) since the 2006 census. There were 1,227 households, comprising 1,617 males and 1,713 females, giving a sex ratio of 0.94 males per female. The median age was 38.9 years (compared with 37.4 years nationally), with 681 people (20.5%) aged under 15 years, 600 (18.0%) aged 15 to 29, 1,350 (40.5%) aged 30 to 64, and 699 (21.0%) aged 65 or older.

Ethnicities were 78.0% European/Pākehā, 27.7% Māori, 2.6% Pacific peoples, 5.2% Asian, and 1.7% other ethnicities. People may identify with more than one ethnicity.

The percentage of people born overseas was 16.5, compared with 27.1% nationally.

Although some people chose not to answer the census's question about religious affiliation, 48.6% had no religion, 32.6% were Christian, 6.7% had Māori religious beliefs, 1.1% were Hindu, 0.2% were Muslim, 0.3% were Buddhist and 2.6% had other religions.

Of those at least 15 years old, 411 (15.5%) people had a bachelor's or higher degree, and 513 (19.4%) people had no formal qualifications. The median income was $29,200, compared with $31,800 nationally. 267 people (10.1%) earned over $70,000 compared to 17.2% nationally. The employment status of those at least 15 was that 1,191 (45.0%) people were employed full-time, 360 (13.6%) were part-time, and 114 (4.3%) were unemployed.

References

Suburbs of Tauranga
Populated places around the Tauranga Harbour